Ballmastrz: 9009 is an adult animated television series created by animator and voice actor Christy Karacas. It premiered on April 9, 2018 on Adult Swim and was produced by Titmouse, Inc. and Williams Street. The series stars actress Natasha Lyonne as the voice of Gaz Digzy, an athletic superstar in a dystopian future where humanity is satiated by a violent sport simply known as "The Game". The series is characterized by anime-style iconography, dark humor, and shock value.

In July 2019, the show was renewed for a second season, which premiered on February 24, 2020. A special titled Ballmastrz: Rubicon aired on February 20, 2023. The special picks up where the last episode leaves off, it was produced by PFFR, and animated by Studio 4°C. The special has a more traditional anime style than the series, and is meant to serve as a fork possibly leading to future seasons. It is currently unknown whether or not Adult Swim will allow the series to continue.

Premise
In a post-apocalyptic world ravaged by a string of devastating "Rad Wars," a mysterious demigod cyborg named Crayzar creates a roller derby-like sport known as "The Game", in which two teams try to score more points than the other using a ball. During the match, players can be "killed" (in that they are teleported to a holding area) to take them out of the match. The series follows Gaz Digzy, the former captain of the best team in the Game, The Boom Boom Boys, who is demoted to playing on the worst team in the Game, The Leptons. Her only way back to the top is to somehow lead these pathetic misfits and 'ultimate losers' to victory.

As the series progresses, The Game is slowly clarified. Initially an ill-explained violent sport between two teams with balls, it developed into a very simple competition where each team attempts to score goals with their respective ball, the goals being a small ball-sized indent on opposing sides of the play area the ball is stuck into. The balls themselves are anthropomorphic and sapient, and their personalities are similar to each team's anime-inspired theme.

Cast and characters

Main
 Natasha Lyonne as Gaz Digzy, a star athlete in "The Game" and a former captain of the Boom Boom Boys, who wrecked her own career due to sheer boredom and subsequently found herself teamless, out of shape, and maligned by various diseases. She is foul-mouthed, hard drinking and has-been whose only hope is to join the Leptons and reclaim her glory. Though Ace Ambling, the young lead player of the Leptons, looks up to her, she usually ridicules him, but she slowly begins to appreciate his appraisal of her. Despite constantly being drunk, she is shown to be very knowledgeable in playing the Game and occasionally shows competence and teamwork skills. By the end of Season 1, she warms up to the Leptons and decides to stay as their new captain. In Season 2, Gaz's full name is revealed to be Gazmerelda Digzfield, daughter of moon mining tycoon Rupert T. Digzfield IV, and it is also revealed that she became a player in the Game as a way of getting back at her uptight family. As the series progress, she became more sociable, happy, and responsible due to spending time with the Leptons, particularly Ace who brings the best out of her due to his unwavering faith and belief in her. Near the Season 2 finale, she began to get back in shape and decided to train sober and become clean. To show her growth as a person, she became selfless and was willing to give up her family fame and fortune by disowning her father to go back leading the Leptons once more, and stated that her true family are the Leptons, who truly loved her and accepted her for who she is and had given her the sense of belonging she never got in her whole life.
 Jessica DiCicco as Ace Ambling, a 12-year-old orphan and the lead player of the Leptons. He is bright, cheerful, and optimistic, but can lose his patience when things don't go as planned. He looks up to Gaz, and though he seems oblivious to her indifference to him, he eventually realizes her flaws and attempts to bring out the best in her. Despite his cheery demeanor, he often feels neglected or looked down upon by the team. Ace is revealed to be descended from the Ballmasters who fought in the Rad Wars; he can become one by fusing with Babyball and can change forms while doing so.
 DiCicco also plays Duleena "Dee Dee" Duneeda, an anime-esque girl on the team. She is usually soft-spoken and cares for her teammates, but will occasionally explode in a rage when provoked. She is also shown to have a crush on Leto and gets angered when he tries to downplay his relation to her. She is a former vampire hunter and thus has a large amount of knowledge on the occult.
 Dana Snyder as Babyball, a crass and cynical The Game ball who is similar to Gaz Digzy, he looks down on his own team and wishes for better players. However, he can access a special ability when paired with Ace, whom he dislikes due to his cheeriness; he does begin to warm up to Ace and eventually calls him his friend. Despite this, Babyball is selfish, boastful, and will mock his teammates regardless.
 Snyder also voices Stinkfinger, a living severed finger that reeks and is part of the rival team, the Murderous Misfits.
 Eric Bauza as Flypp Champion, a body stump with a spiked "sensory deprivation" helmet. A true warrior, Flypp must rely on his navel to perform certain tasks. Despite claiming to have amazing abilities, which he arguably does, he still seems rather useless and is typically brushed aside with ease by other players. He was apparently once a great defender of the innocent, but through a series of training regimes, chose to simplify himself and put all his energy in his power Umbilicus, a large umbilical cord that extends from his navel. While his name is officially spelled "Flypp", some of the promotional and in-show material spells it as "Flipp".
 Dave Willis as Leto Otel, a lethargic and pessimistic member of the Leptons. He lacks the motivation and prowess to be an effective player and does not seem interested in the Game, to the point that he is not phased by mortal injuries. He quotes poetry and seems intelligent at times. While Dee Dee openly shows affection for him, Leto tries to downplay it. He has at times revealed to become sad, more so than usual, when Dee Dee briefly leaves.
 Christy Karacas as Crayzar, the ruler of the Consortium who created the Game to please humanity. He has lived for thousands of years and lacks any sort of genitalia, as he is implied to be some type of artificial lifeform. He lived through the Rad Wars and gave life to all of the game balls, which were originally used as weapons in the wars. He seemingly admires the Leptons, but after Ace and Babyball's fusion, might have ulterior motives. In the Rubicon special, its revealed that Crayzar is of a demigod species known as the Saytars, with his true name being Gold Saytar, and that he went against his assigned mission to find the Cosmic Diary by tricking all of Earth into worshipping him as a god via The Game.
 Karacas also plays Aboo Buvu, a The Game ball with sunglasses who reports the news and acts as a moderator for The Game. In some material produced for the show, he is referred to as Blabberball.
 Christopher McCulloch as various characters.
The Leptons also include two characters who do not have voice actors but are prominent. Lulu, a large green ape-like creature who is afraid of everything; and Bob, a  diminutive grey alien, who appears to be useless and typically gets beaten the worst.

Guest
 Norman Reedus as Bacchus LaBrute, the blue-skinned alien Greaser-style leader of a notorious biker gang called the Middle Fingers who live out in the wastelands.
 Stephanie Sheh as Luna, the leader of the Sailor Moon-esque team the Ashigari Princesses and an old rival of Gaz who wants to steal the secret of the Ballmaster formation.
 Sheh also plays Rudy Drax, a child without limbs, who idolizes Flypp Champion.
 Mike O’Gorman as Buddy Marinara, the Leptons' two-faced manager who is always looking for a way to exploit his team's newfound fame.
 O'Gorman also plays as a shopkeeper of an Animal Shelter that Ace volunteers at.
 Jo Firestone as Ace's Robot Mother, a fake robot mother that Gaz and Babyball make to cheer him up.
 Rachel Dratch as The Blab, a small talking parasite that grows out of Gaz's stomach.
 Cree Summer as Obah Wexley, a famous talk show host. She is a parody of Oprah Winfrey.
 Doc Hammer as Milky van Montebag, a manager who tries to cash in on Ace's fame.
 Hammer also plays as the mecha butler in Rupert's mansion.
 Ed Asner as Rupert T. Digzfield IV, Gaz's evil mega-rich father and founder of the Digzfield Lunar Drilling Corporation.
 Joshua Henry  as Demon Saytar, Crayzar's father.
 Timothy Levitch as Tyetaynus, Crayzar's younger brother.

Episodes

Season 1 (2018)
Phil Ahn and Christy Karacas provide the storyboards for every episode, but there are different co-storyboarders that work with them depending on the episode.

Season 2 (2020)

Ballmastrz: Rubicon (2023)

Production

Development
Around 2014, Karacas began working on the show. On May 7, 2015, it was announced that Adult Swim had given a pilot order to the production as part of their 2015-16 slate of returning series, pilots and specials. The pilot would become Ballmastrz: 9009. On August 4, 2017, it was announced that Adult Swim had given the production a series order consisting of the first season. The series was created by Christy Karacas, co-creator of Superjail! and produced by animation company Titmouse, Inc.

Animation
The series is animated with Adobe Animate and produced by a team of around 20 animators from Titmouse, Inc. offices in New York City. When the animators were discussing the artistic direction of the series, Titmouse president and producer Chris Prynoski described the show's animation style as appearing "like it was drawn by High School kids who try to draw anime".

For the Ballmastrz: Rubicon special, the animation team was changed to Studio 4°C. Karacas stated that the decision was done as he wanted the special to "dive into the actual anime world." As a result, the special features a new art style.

Casting
Alongside the initial series announcement, it was reported that Natasha Lyonne was cast in the series' lead role of Gaz Digzy. The main cast was also set to be rounded out by Dana Snyder, Dave Willis, Jessica DiCicco, Eric Bauza, Christopher McCulloch, and Karacas. Guests were set to include Norman Reedus, Stephanie Sheh, and Mike O’Gorman.

Marketing
Alongside the initial series announcement, Adult Swim released the first official trailer for the series.

On February 22, 2020, Adult Swim hosted an event at the Plaza Theatre in Atlanta, dedicated to the premiere of the second season of the series. During the event, 5 unreleased episodes were broadcast followed by a Q&A with creator Christy Karacas and voice actors Dana Snyder and Dave Willis.

Reception
The series has received positive reviews from critics. Daniel Kurland of Den of Geek described the series by saying that it "feels like a computer did a speedball and the finished product is a disorienting, glitched-out drug overdose." Sean Shuman of MovieWeb said that the series has a simple premise, hyper-stylization, and genuine character, stating that the series is "a show that feels like an ancient anime ripped out from a classic VHS tape, touched up with a modern aesthetic, and then trimmed down to eleven minutes."

References

External links

2018 American television series debuts
2020 American television series endings
2010s American adult animated television series
2010s American animated comedy television series
2010s American comic science fiction television series
2020s American adult animated television series
2020s American animated comedy television series
2020s American comic science fiction television series
Adult Swim original programming
American adult animated comedy television series
American adult animated science fiction television series
American comic science fiction television series
American adult animated sports television series
American flash adult animated television series
Anime-influenced Western animated television series
English-language television shows
Fiction set in the 7th millennium or beyond
Fictional ball games
Post-apocalyptic animated television series
Studio 4°C
Television series by Williams Street
Television series created by Christy Karacas
Television series set in the future
Toonami